The following lists events that happened during 1850 in Australia.

Governors
Governors of the Australian colonies:
Governor of New South Wales – Sir Charles Augustus FitzRoy
Governor of South Australia – Sir Henry Fox Young
Governor of Tasmania – Sir William Denison
Governor of Western Australia as a Crown Colony – Captain Charles Fitzgerald.

Events
 26 January – The Irish Exile, a weekly newspaper, starts publishing in Hobart by Patrick O'Donoghue: aimed mainly at fellow Irish prisoners and deportees.
 5 August – Port Phillip (later called Victoria) established as a separate colony from New South Wales.
 1 June – First convicts arrive in Western Australia, ticket-of-leave transportation suspended in New South Wales.
 1 October – University of Sydney is founded as Australia's first university.

Science and technology
 Bucolus fourneti - described by Étienne Mulsant

Births

 7 January 
 Joseph James Fletcher, biologist (born in New Zealand) (d. 1926)
 Robert Richardson, journalist, poet and writer (d. 1901)
 29 January – Lawrence Hargrave, engineer, explorer, and inventor (born in the United Kingdom) (d. 1915)
 1 February – Sir Matthew Davis, Victorian politician (d. 1912)
 13 February – Michael Kelly, 4th Archbishop of Sydney (born in Ireland) (d. 1940)
 17 February – Alf Morgans, 4th Premier of Western Australia (born in the United Kingdom) (d. 1933)
 23 February – Octavius Beale, piano manufacturer and philanthropist (born in Ireland) (d. 1930)
 25 April – William Knox, Victorian politician and businessman (d. 1913)
 26 April – James Drake, Queensland politician (born in the United Kingdom) (d. 1941)
 12 May – Sir Frederick Holder, 19th Premier of South Australia (d. 1909)
 23 August – Sir John Cockburn, 18th Premier of South Australia (born in the United Kingdom) (d. 1929)
 7 September – James Stewart, Queensland politician (born in the United Kingdom) (d. 1931)
 22 October – Charles Kingston, 20th Premier of South Australia (d. 1908)
 23 November – Henry Lowther Clarke, 1st Anglican Archbishop of Melbourne (born in the United Kingdom) (d. 1926)
 3 December – Sir Richard Butler, 23rd Premier of South Australia (born in the United Kingdom) (b. 1850)
 21 December – Sir William McMillan, New South Wales politician and businessman (born in Ireland) (d. 1926)
 Unknown – Christie Palmerston, explorer and prospector (d. 1897)
 Unknown – Mei Quong Tart, merchant (born in China) (d. 1903)

Deaths

 22 January – William Westall, landscape artist (born and died in the United Kingdom) (b. 1781)
 9 February – Elizabeth Macarthur, pastoralist and merchant (born in the United Kingdom) (b. 1766)
 16 June – William Lawson, New South Wales politician and explorer (born in the United Kingdom) (b. 1774)
 3 September – Ikey Solomon, convict (born in the United Kingdom) (b. 1787)
 Unknown, possibly April – Yuranigh, guide and stockman (b. 1820)

References

 
Australia
Years of the 19th century in Australia